The National Council of Canadian Muslims (NCCM) is a Canadian Muslim civil liberties and advocacy organization. NCCM was formerly known as the Canadian Council on American-Islamic Relations (CAIR-CAN).

NCCM is active in human rights and civil liberties work, media relations and public advocacy. NCCM comments on current issues, provides anti-discrimination services, produces numerous publications and contributes frequent op-eds to Canadian newspapers.

In 2014, the NCCM sued former Canadian Prime Minister Stephen Harper and his spokesman Jason MacDonald for defamation for alleging that the organization had "documented ties" to Hamas, a designated terrorist group in Canada. In February 2015, Jason MacDonald was questioned under oath in the defamation case and Stephen Harper claimed parliamentary privilege to avoid testifying. That same month, MacDonald resigned as the Prime Minister's communications director. In March 2017, in a publicly announced settlement of the libel lawsuit, Jason MacDonald  admitted that his statements regarding the NCCM were inaccurate. The Government of Canada also issued a statement "disavowing MacDonald's suggestion that the council had terrorist ties."

According to 2001 census, there were 579,640 Muslims in Canada, just under 2% of the population. In 2021, the Canadian Muslim population was estimated to be 1.8 million or 4.9%.

See also 
 Canadian Islamic Congress
 Council on American-Islamic Relations
 Islam in Canada
 Islamic Society of North America
 Islamic Supreme Council of Canada

References

External links 
 National Council of Canadian Muslims (NCCM)

Human rights organizations based in Canada
Islamic organizations based in Canada
Civil rights organizations in Canada